This is a list of current and former military installations in the Commonwealth of Massachusetts.

Current military installations in Massachusetts

Joint facilities

Bases

 Joint Base Cape Cod (state designation, not federally recognized)

Centers

 David S. Connolly Armed Forces Reserve Center
 Westover Armed Forces Reserve Center

United States Army

Camps

 Camp Edwards
 Camp Curtis Guild

Centers

 Crosman Army Reserve Center
 Poncin Army Reserve Center
 Combat Capabilities Development Command Soldier Center

Forts

 Fort Devens

Heliports

 Camp Edwards Heliport

Laboratories

 Base Camp Integration Laboratory

United States Navy

Centers

 Navy Operational Support Center Quincy

United States Air Force

Bases

 Barnes Air National Guard Base
 Hanscom Air Force Base
 Otis Air National Guard Base
 Westover Air Reserve Base

United States Space Force

Stations

 Cape Cod Space Force Station

United States Coast Guard

Air Stations

 Coast Guard Air Station Cape Cod

Bases

 Coast Guard Base Boston
 Coast Guard Base Cape Cod

Depots

 United States Coast Guard Buoy Depot, South Weymouth

Stations

 Coast Guard Station Brant Point
 Coast Guard Station Cape Cod Canal
 Coast Guard Station Chatham
 Coast Guard Station Gloucester
 Coast Guard Station Menemsha
 Coast Guard Station Merrimack River
 Coast Guard Station Point Allerton
 Coast Guard Station Provincetown
 Coast Guard Station Scituate
 Coast Guard Station Woods Hole

Former military installations in Massachusetts

United States Army

Army Airfields

 Hyannis Army Airfield
 Moore Army Airfield
 New Bedford Army Airfield
 Otis Army Airfield

Armories

 Hudson Armory
 Lawrence Light Guard Armory
 Springfield Armory
 Water Shops Armory

Arsenals

 Charlestown Arsenal
 Watertown Arsenal

Bases

 South Boston Army Base

Camps

 Camp Adams
 Camp Andrew
 Camp Banks
 Camp Brigham
 Camp Cameron
 Camp Candoit
 Camp Chase
 Camp Dalton
 Camp Edmunds
 Camp Ellsworth
 Camp Framingham (Dalton, Bartlett, McGuinness, Dewey)
 Camp Guild
 Camp Havedoneit
 Camp Hill
 Camp Hingham
 Camp Hobson
 Camp Joe Hooker
 Camp Houston
 Ipswich Camp
 Camp Lander
 Camp Lincoln
 Camp Massasoit
 Camp Meigs
 Camp Myles Standish
 Camp Perkins
 Plymouth Camp
 Camp Prescott
 Camp Prospect Hill
 Camp Scott
 South Hingham Camp
 Camp Stanton
 Camp Sutton
 Camp Washburn
 Camp Wellfleet
 Camp Wightman
 Camp Wool

Centers

 Antiaircraft Artillery Training Center, Camp Edwards
 Gardner Army Reserve Center
 Greenfield United States Army Reserve Center
 United States Army Reserve Center Hingham
 MacArthur Army Reserve Center
 Harry J. Malony United States Army Reserve Center
 Millis United States Army Reserve Center
 
Firing Ranges

 Popponesset Firing Range
 Scorton Neck Firing Range

Forts

 Acushnet Fort
 Fort Andrew
 Fort Andrews
 Fort Banks
 Beverly Fort
 Fort Dalton
 Fort Dawes
 Fort Defiance 
 Fort Duvall
 Eastern Point Fort
 Fort Glover (Gilbert Heights Fort)
 Fort Heath
 Fort Independence
 Fort Juniper
 Fort Lee
 Long Point Battery
 Fort Miller (Fort Darby)
 Fort Nichols (Fort Merrimac)
 Old Stone Fort
 Fort Philip
 Fort Phoenix
 Fort Pickering
 Fort Revere
 Fort Taber (Rodman)
 Fort Ruckman
 Fort at Salisbury Point
 Fort Sewall
 Stage Fort
 Fort Standish (Boston)
 Fort Standish (Plymouth)
 Fort Strong (East Boston & Long Island)
 Fort Warren
 Fort Washington
 Fort Winthrop

Heliports

 George H. Crosman United States Army Reserve Center Heliport

Hospitals

 Lovell General Hospital East
 Lovell General Hospital North
 Lovell General Hospital South
 Murphy Army Hospital

Labs

 Army Materials Technology Laboratory
 
Nike Sites

 Reading Nike Site B-03
 Danvers Nike Site B-05
 Beverly Nike Site B-15
 Nahant Nike Site B-17
 Fort Heath Nike Site B-21DC
 Fort Banks Nike Site B-21R
 Fort Duvall Nike Site B-36
 Weymouth (Quincy) Nike Site B-37
 Hingham Nike Site B-38
 Blue Hills (Milton) Nike Site B-55
 Needham Nike Site B-63
 Lincoln (Wayland) Nike Site B-73
 Burlington Nike Site B-84
 Bedford Nike Site B-85
 Rehoboth Nike Site PR-19
 Swansea Nike Site PR-29

Plants

 Lowell Ordnance Plant
 Pilgrim Ordnance Works

Proving grounds

 Scituate Proving Ground
 
Military Reservations

 Barneys Joy Point Military Reservation
 Brewster Islands Military Reservation
 Butler Point Military Reservation
 Calf Island Military Reservation
 East Point Military Reservation
 Elizabeth Islands Military Reservation
 Fourth Cliff Military Reservation
 Long Island Military Reservation
 Lovell's Island Military Reservation
 Mishaum Point Military Reservation
 Sagamore Hill Military Reservation
 Salisbury Beach Military Reservation

Training

 Fort Devens-Sudbury Training Annex

United States Navy

Naval Air Stations

 Naval Air Station Chatham
 Naval Air Station South Weymouth
 Naval Air Station Squantum
 Naval Training Station Marblehead
 Massachusetts State Militia Aviation Camp

Naval Airfields

 No Man's Land Navy Airfield

Naval Ammunition Depots

 Hingham Naval Ammunition Depot (Hingham Naval Ammunition Depot Annex)

Areas

 Gull Island Bomb Area
 Tisbury Great Pond Target Area 
 Weepecket Island Bomb Area

Naval Auxiliary Air Facilities

 Naval Auxiliary Air Facility Ayer
 Naval Auxiliary Air Facility Beverly
 Naval Auxiliary Air Facility Hyannis
 Naval Auxiliary Air Facility Martha's Vineyard
 Naval Auxiliary Air Facility Nantucket
 Naval Auxiliary Air Facility New Bedford
 Naval Auxiliary Air Facility Otis

Camps

 Camp Hingham
 Camp Plunkett (Navy predecessor to Camp Curtis Guild)

Facilities

 United States Naval Mine Test Facility, Provincetown
 Naval Facility Nantucket

Hospitals

 Naval Hospital Boston

Plants

 Naval Weapons Industrial Reserve Plant, Bedford
 
Outlying Landing Fields

 Naval Outlying Landing Field Mansfield
 Naval Outlying Landing Field Norwood
 Naval Outlying Landing Field Plymouth
 Naval Outlying Landing Field Westfield

Reserve Centers

 Naval Reserve Center, Chicopee
 Navy and Marine Corps Reserve Center, Lawrence

Ranges

 Nomans Land Range
 Sandy Neck Bomb Target Range

Test Stations

 United States Navy Field Test Station, Fort Heath

Naval shipyards

 Boston Navy Yard (Chelsea Naval Annex, East Boston Naval Annex, Boston Naval Yard Fuel Depot Annex)
 South Boston Naval Annex

United States Air Force

Air Force Bases

 Otis Air Force Base
 Westover Air Force Base

Centers

 Air Force Electronic Systems Center

Facilities

 Air Force Special Projects Production Facility
 Post Attack Command and Control System Facility, Hadley

Hospitals

 551st United States Air Force Hospital (Otis AFB)
 Westover Air Force Base Hospital

Laboratories

 Air Force Cambridge Research Laboratories
 Fort Franklin Battlespace Laboratory

Air Force Plants

 United States Air Force Plant 28
 United States Air Force Plant 29
 United States Air Force Plant 63
 United States Air Force Plant 69

Ranges

 Monomoy Island Gunnery Range
 Quabbin Reservoir Precision Bombing and Gunnery Range

Air Force Stations

 North Truro Air Force Station
 Stony Brook Air Force Station

Texas Towers

 Texas Tower 2
 Texas Tower 3

United States Coast Guard

Air Stations

 Coast Guard Air Station Salem
 Coast Guard Aviation Station Ten Pound Island

Loran

 Loran Transmitting Station Martha’s Vineyard
 LORAN-C transmitter Nantucket

Stations

 Coast Guard Station Manomet Point
 Coast Guard Station New Bedford

References

External links

American Forts Network, lists forts and some other military facilities in the United States and Canada

 
 
Massachusetts
Massachusetts